Aristida is a large, broadly distributed genus of flowering plants in the grass family, Poaceae. , there are around 300 accepted species in Kew's Plants of the World Online.

References

L
Aristida